Emilie Esther (born 12 May 1999) is a Danish singer who rose to fame as the winner of the eighth season of the Danish series of The X Factor. She competed in the age 15–22 category with Remee as her mentor. After she won, she was signed to Sony Music and her debut single "Undiscovered" topped the Danish Singles Chart. "Undiscovered" is written and composed by Karen Poole and Remee. Emilie Esther´s second single, "Inescapable", is produced by RedOne and TinyIsland.

Performances during X Factor

Discography

Singles

EPs
Rare (2015)

References

External links 
 

1999 births
Living people
People from Aalborg
The X Factor winners
X Factor (Danish TV series) contestants
21st-century Danish  women singers